The 1984 Individual Speedway Junior European Championship was the eighth edition of the European motorcycle speedway Under-21 Championships. All participants under the age of 21. The title was won by Marvyn Cox.

The meeting was blighted by the death of Leif Wahlman. During heat 13 his engine seized, causing him to fall and then he was hit from behind. The 19-year-old Swede suffered catastrophic brain injuries and died later in hospital.

European final
July 28, 1984
 King's Lynn, Norfolk Arena

References

1984
Individual U-21
Individual U-21
Speedway competitions in the United Kingdom